Moriyasu (written:  or ) is a Japanese surname. Notable people with the surname include:

, Japanese footballer and manager
, Japanese footballer
, Japanese footballer
Riku Moriyasu (born 1995), Japanese footballer
, Japanese footballer 
Shotaro Moriyasu (1924–1955), Japanese jazz pianist

Moriyasu is also a masculine Japanese given name. Notable people with the name include:

, Imperial Japanese Navy officer

Japanese-language surnames
Japanese masculine given names